Jim (abbr. of Jotain ihan muuta, in English Something completely different) is a Finnish national television channel that replaced Nelonen Plus on 26 February 2007. Jim is part of Nelonen Media's media division, which is part of the Sanoma Group's Finnish media business division, Sanoma Media Finland.

The programming of the channel consists of imported programs: mainly do-it-yourself programs, documentaries and popular series such as Border Security: Australia, Border Security: Canada, Pawn Stars and American Pickers. Also, it features some lesser-known television series, such as Bondi Rescue, Ninja Warrior, Massive Moves and Hoarders.

References

External links 
 Official website  

Television channels in Finland
Television channels and stations established in 2007
2007 establishments in Finland